The Dig Your Roots Tour was the third headlining concert tour by American country music duo Florida Georgia Line. The tour is in support of their third studio album Dig Your Roots (2016), it began on May 12, 2016, in Tupelo, Mississippi and finished on May 6, 2017, in Quebec City, Quebec.

Background
In January 2016, Florida Georgia Line announced the tour.

Opening acts
Cole Swindell
The Cadillac Three
Kane Brown 
LANco
Chris Lane
Granger Smith/Earl Dibbles Jr.
Dustin Lynch
Ryan Follese
Morgan Wallen

Setlists
{{hidden
| headercss = background: #FFFF00; font-size: 100%; width: 59%;
| contentcss = text-align: left; font-size: 100%; width: 75%;
| header = Setlist until June 17, 2016 
| content = 

"Party People" 
"It'z Just What We Do"
"Round Here"
"Anything Goes"
"Smooth"
"Confession"
"Stay" 
"May We All"
"Dig Your Roots"
B-Stage
"H.O.L.Y."
"Songwriters Session" 
"Three Little Birds" 
"Life is a Honeymoon"
Back To Main Stage
"Sun Daze" 
"Get Your Shine On"
Encore
"This Is How We Roll"
Cover medley: "Ridin' Dirty"/"Should've Been a Cowboy"/"Last Resort"/"Everybody (Backstreet's Back)"/"Jump Around"
"Cruise"
}}
{{hidden
| headercss = background: #FFFF00; font-size: 100%; width: 59%;
| contentcss = text-align: left; font-size: 100%; width: 75%;
| header = Setlist from June 17 to October 1, 2016 
| content = 

"This Is How We Roll"
"It'z Just What We Do"
"Round Here"
"Anything Goes"
"Smooth"
"Confession"
"Stay" 
"May We All"
"Dig Your Roots"
"H.O.L.Y."
"Songwriters Session" 
"Three Little Birds" 
"Life is a Honeymoon"
"Sun Daze" 
"Get Your Shine On"
Encore
"Party People" 
Cover medley: "Ridin' Dirty"/"Should've Been a Cowboy"/"Last Resort"/"Everybody (Backstreet's Back)"/"Jump Around"
"Cruise"
}}
{{hidden
| headercss = background: #FFFF00; font-size: 100%; width: 59%;
| contentcss = text-align: left; font-size: 100%; width: 75%;
| header = Setlist from October 1, 2016 to May 6, 2017
| content = 

"This Is How We Roll"
"It'z Just What We Do"
"Round Here"
"Anything Goes"
"Dig Your Roots"
"Confession"
"Smooth"
"May We All"
"God, Your Mama, and Me"
B-Stage
"Dirt"
"Dayum, Baby/Hell Raisin' Heat Of The Summer/Here's To The Good Times"
"H.O.L.Y."
Back To Main Stage
"Sun Daze" 
"Get Your Shine On"
Encore
"Party People" 
Cover medley: "Ridin' Dirty"/"Should've Been a Cowboy"/"Last Resort"/"Everybody (Backstreet's Back)"/"Jump Around"
"Cruise"
Notes:
In Nashville The Backstreet Boys joined FGL on-stage to sing "Everybody (Backstreet's Back)" & To Live Debut "God Your Mama & Me".
}}

Tour dates

List of festivals

References

2016 concert tours
Florida Georgia Line concert tours